Mid-Formartine is one of the nineteen wards used to elect members of the Aberdeenshire Council. It elects four Councillors. The ward's name refers to the region of Formartine, north of Aberdeen.

Councillors

Election Results

2022 Election
2022 Aberdeenshire Council election

2017 Election
2017 Aberdeenshire Council election

2012 Election
2012 Aberdeenshire Council election

2007 Election
2007 Aberdeenshire Council election

By-election
Following the election of Karen Adam (SNP) to Holyrood at the 2021 Scottish Parliament election on 6 May and her subsequent resignation as Councillor for Mid-Formartine ward a by-election was called on Thursday, 19 August 2021.

2021 By-election
Mid Formartine By-election 2021 - Aberdeenshire Council

References

Wards of Aberdeenshire